The 2013 New Mexico State Aggies football team represents New Mexico State University in the 2013 NCAA Division I FBS football season. The Aggies were led by first–year head coach Doug Martin and played their home games at Aggie Memorial Stadium. They competed as an independent. They were a football–only member of the Sun Belt Conference (SBC) from 2014 to 2017.

Schedule

Aggie Vision affiliates, by game:
Minnesota- FCS Pacific [JIP], Comcast New Mexico, FS Arizona+, Altitude2, BTN2Go
UTEP- Comcast New Mexico, Altitude2, KASY
San Diego State- Comcast New Mexico, Altitude, FS Arizona+, KASY, KVIA, FS San Diego, ESPN3
Rice- Comcast New Mexico, Altitude [JIP], Comcast Houston+, KVIA, ESPN3
Abilene Christian- FCS Pacific [JIP], Comcast New Mexico, Altitude, FS Arizona+, KVIA, ESPN3
Boston College- Comcast New Mexico, Altitude2, FS Arizona+, Comcast Houston+, KASY, KVIA, ESPN3
Idaho- Comcast New Mexico, Altitude, Comcast Houston+, KASY, KVIA, ESPN3

Game summaries

@ Texas

Minnesota

UTEP

@ UCLA

First meeting between the two schools. New Mexico State head coach Doug Martin replaced DeWayne Walker, who was a former UCLA defensive coordinator. Nick Pasquale was remembered during the game.

1st quarter scoring: UCLA – Jordon James 4-yard run (Kaim Fairbairn kick)

2nd quarter scoring: UCLA – Steven Manfro 20-yard pass from Brett Hundley (Fairbairn kick); UCLA – Manfro 12-yard run (Fairbairn kick); UCLA – Fairbairn 38-yard field goal; UCLA – Devin Fuller 21-yard pass from Hundley (Fairbairn kick)

3rd quarter scoring: UCLA – Shaquell Evans 7-yard pass from Hundley (Fairbairn kick); UCLA – James 19-yard run (Fairbairn kick)

4th quarter scoring: NMSU – Adam Shapiro 33-yard pass from A. McDonald (Mitch Johnson kick); UCLA – Malcolm Jones 3-yard run (Fairbairn kick); NMSU – B. Betancourt 4-yard run (Johnson kick failed); UCLA – Jones 3-yard run (Fairbairn kick)

San Diego State

@ New Mexico

Rice

Abilene Christian

@ Louisiana–Lafayette

Boston College

@ Florida Atlantic

Idaho

References

New Mexico State
New Mexico State Aggies football seasons
New Mexico State Aggies football